Firebirds: An Anthology of Original Fantasy and Science Fiction is a collection of short stories for young adults written by authors associated with Firebird Books, released on that imprint in 2003. It was followed by a sequel anthology, Firebirds Rising, in 2006, which was a  World Fantasy Award Finalist. A third anthology, Firebirds Soaring, was published in Spring 2009.

Contents
Introduction by Sharyn November
"Cotillion" by Delia Sherman
"The Baby in the Night Deposit Box" by Megan Whalen Turner
"Beauty" by Sherwood Smith
"Mariposa" by Nancy Springer
"Max Mondrosch" by Lloyd Alexander
"The Fall of Ys" by Meredith Ann Pierce
"Medusa" by Michael Cadnum
"The Black Fox" by Emma Bull (adaptation) and Charles Vess (illustration)
"Byndley" by Patricia A. McKillip
"The Lady of the Ice Garden" by Kara Dalkey
"Hope Chest" by Garth Nix
"Chasing the Wind" by Elizabeth E. Wein
"Little Dot" by Diana Wynne Jones
"Remember Me" by Nancy Farmer
"Flotsam" by Nina Kiriki Hoffman
"The Flying Woman" by Laurel Winter

References

External links

Green Man review

2003 anthologies
Fantasy anthologies
Young adult anthologies